SET domain containing 6 is a protein in humans that is encoded by the SETD6 gene.

SETD6 monomethylates the RelA subunit of nuclear factor kappa B (NF-κB). RelA mono-methylation at lysine 310 (RelAK310me1) leads to the constitutive repression of RelA target genes by recruiting the PKMT G9a-like protein (GLP), which catalyzes H3K9me2 and leads to chromatin silencing and gene repression. In response to stimulation with TNFa and lipopolysaccharide, phosphorylation of RelA at serine 311 (RelAS311ph) by PKCzeta physically blocks the interaction between GLP and RelAK310me1, leading to transcription activation.

PAK4 Methylation by SETD6 Promotes the Activation of the Wnt/β-Catenin Pathway. SETD6 binds and methylates PAK4 both in vitro and in cells at chromatin. Depletion of SETD6 in various cell lines leads to a dramatic reduction in the expression of Wnt/�-catenin target genes.

SETD6 binds to but does not methylate DJ1. Under basal conditions, SETD6 and DJ1 associate with chromatin which inhibits DJ1 to activate Nrf2 transcription activity. In response to oxidative stress, SETD6 mRNA and protein levels are dramatically reduced.

SETD6 specifically binds and methylates PLK1 during mitosis at K209 and K413. Depletion of SETD6, as well as the double substitution of the lysine residues (K209/413R), leads to elevation in PLK1 catalytic activity, leading to  the acceleration of the different mitotic steps, ending with early cytokinesis.

References

Further reading 

 
 
 
 
 
 

Human proteins